MHMR may refer to: 
Texas Department of State Health Services, a parent organization of the former Texas Department of Mental Health and Mental Retardation
Virginia Department of Mental Health, Mental Retardation, and Substance Abuse